Anolis ignigularis is a species of lizard in the family Dactyloidae. The species is found in the Dominican Republic.

References

Anoles
Endemic fauna of the Dominican Republic
Reptiles of the Dominican Republic
Reptiles described in 1939
Taxa named by Robert Mertens